Mollinedia marquetiana is a species of plant in the Monimiaceae family. It is endemic to Brazil.  It is threatened by habitat loss.

References

marquetiana
Endemic flora of Brazil
Flora of the Atlantic Forest
Flora of Bahia
Flora of Espírito Santo
Vulnerable flora of South America
Taxonomy articles created by Polbot